Waist beads are a piece of jewelry worn around the waist or hip area. Originating in Africa, waist beads are traditionally worn by women as a symbol of waist size, beauty, sexuality, femininity, fertility, well-being, and maturity. 

They are commonly made of glass, metal, crystals, gemstones, charms, wooden beads, or plastic beads and typically strung on a cotton thread, twine, thread, wire, clear cord, or elastic cord. The colors and materials used may have symbolic, cultural, or personal significance to the wearer.

The culture or beliefs of the wearer determines when the beads are worn or taken off. Waist beads can also be used for health tracking such as weight loss. More modern uses of waist beads are related to fashion.

Origins 
Waist beads originated in Egypt, where they were called girdles. Egyptians wore them around their waist or lower waist. Girdles were a symbol of status and were made of chains, wire, thread, and shells, and contained multiple colors. Today, people from many African cultures wear waist beads, including Ghanaians, Senegalese, Yorubas, Igbos, Ewes, Ashantis, Krobos, and Ga-Adanbes. Each culture has its own reason for wearing them. Waist beads are commonly given around the time young women go through puberty throughout most of the African cultures that wear waist beads.

Ghanaian culture 
In Ghanaian culture, women begin to wear waist beads as they age and on orders from their mothers. Beads are a rite of passage during puberty which is associated with fertility and marriage in Ghanaian culture. This symbolizes maturity and the beginning of womanhood. Dipo is the initiation ceremony that is held for a young woman. Beads are worn on the neck, ankles, and waist. They are often worn on the waist to represent luck. The waist beads are commonly made of seeds, seashells, glass pieces, teeth, ivory, and stones, and are often hand-painted. The bigger the beads are the more mature the woman is sexually. Today, they are used as a fashion statement.

Yoruba 
The Yoruba waist beads are called Ileke, Jigida, and Lagidigba. They are traditionally a piece of jewelry and a piece of their spirituality. Beads are often made from glass, nuts, wood or metal and vary in size and color. Waist beads are a rite of passage in Yoruba because as a young woman outgrows her beads she gets newer ones. These are worn as a symbol of confidence and femininity, fertility, and well-being. They are worn for posture, beauty, weight tracking, protection, growth, sexual and desire. Waist beads can represent royalty and social standing because of the price and quality of the beads. Women of royalty usually wear more expensive and rare beads to distinguish themselves from others.

Igbo 
The Igbos are considered one of the three largest ethnic groups in Nigeria. The use of waist beads in the Igbo culture dates back to 500 BC and has been worn by men and women across all social classes. Waist beads are known as Mgbájí in Igbo language, and they are commonly used during festivities and traditional ceremonies. Waist beads are popular amongst young girls and married women, and are usually made with copper, corals, beads, stones, etc. and held together with string or wire. More than one string is usually worn at a time. “Although presently these waist beads are mostly worn only for traditional Igbo ceremonies such as Igba nkwu (traditional marriage), no Igbo maiden ever joked with her waist beads in the past, and you can still find these Igbo waist beads in the homes of some elderly Igbo women.” Traditionally, Mgbájí is one of the essential items a groom must present to their bride, as the bride’s wedding attire is incomplete without them. Not to mention that the jiggling beads were pleasing to watch as the bride danced towards her new husband. Aside from this, waist beads depict wealth, fertility, and femininity.

Hausa 
The Hausa ethnic group is arguably the largest tribe in present-day Nigeria. The use of beads on different parts of the body by men, women, the young and the old dates back to hundreds of decades. The Hausa are very aesthetic-minded and tend to wear beads around the ankles, necks, wrists, waist, etc. Waist beads among the Hausa are referred to as Jigida. It is common to see newborn females with beads around their waist. Typical Hausa beads are usually tinier than most, and are made of plastic, wood, bones, cowries and shells. In Hausa culture, there are claims that beads can be used to ward off evil, preserving virginity, and protecting girls from getting raped. They are also worn for adornment, enhancing femininity and sensuality. “Hausa girls are naturally beautiful and according to their perception of beauty, a slim waist is a very important measure for looking good. Therefore, adorning a female baby with waist beads is believed to help accentuate her waist and retain the slim feature.” They are allegedly worn by maidens to indicate that they are ripe and ready for marriage. This refers to the fact that Hausa girls tend to marry early, so their mothers may adorn a 12-year-old in beads to indicate that a child is mature and ready to marry a suitor.

Production 
Traditionally when making waist beads, the first step is defining purpose. The purpose of the beads help determine the materials, colors and sizes of the beads. Next, waist or hip measurements are taken and the string is cut to size accordingly. Before adding beads a clasp is added to the end of the string so that the beads can be easily put on. On the opposite end of the string chain loops are added to connect the clasp. Then bead colors and materials are then chosen. The designer can then chose the pattern the beads will follow and add them to the string. Lastly, the waist beads are sealed either with a clamp, a tight knot, a crimp lock, or may be burned together firmly. Then the waist beads are ready for wearing.

Due to recent popularity many small businesses and shops now sell waist beads.

Purpose 
The purpose and meaning of waist beads are individual to the wearer, but may represent personal beliefs or cultural heritage, often expressed through the choice of colors and materials. In many cultures the purpose of waist beads is to signify the beginning of womanhood and to represent fertility. Waist beads are often given to a young woman by her mother to represent her transition into woman hood and her sexuality. Each culture's beliefs determine whether the beads are only purposed to be seen by the woman husband or not. In some cultures there is a sexual aspect to the beads believing they help attract their pattern. Waist beads are also believed to help develop a woman's curves and slim their waist because they don't stretch.

Uses 

 Fashion statement. Many people today wear waist beads as a piece of body jewelry or an accessory.
 Weight control. Others use the waist bead to measure their waist size and over time the band will fall or roll up due to weight loss or weight gain.
 Culture. There are a variety of meanings for waist beads in different cultures such as maturity and sexual attraction. Cultures that traditionally utilize waist beads include the Egyptian culture, Ghana, Yoruba, Ewe, Ashanti, Krobo, Ga-Adangbe, and others.
 Spirituality. Those who are practicing the awareness of the spirit use the waist beads for personal performances.

Bibliography 

 Moroney, Morgan. (2022). "Egyptian Jewelry: A window into Ancient Culture". Johns Hopkins University. 
 This article explains the ancient Egyptian jewelry based on their culture through the American Research Center in Egypt, therefore the information presented has been thoroughly analyzed and studied.
 Yates, Jacquline. (2022). "Waist beads are the exquisite adornments tied to empowering women, celebrating rich culture". Good Morning America. 
 This is a very popular news site, so it should be reliable but does not provide any references of in-depth research.
 Uju. (2021). "The African Waist Beads – Meaning, Significance And Uses". Answers Africa. 
 This is a news and entertainment website that conducts in-depth investigation on topics to provide reliable information to the community.
 Huyhoa. (2022). "Waist Beads: Everything You Need To Know".
 This is where a team of people come together and blog to share their wisdom about many different topic, there is a section that lists the references to provide creditable evidence.
 Dwell Ghana. (2019). "Ghana's Incredible Bead Culture".
 This is a site that assists in relocation people to Ghana that provides knowledge about the Ghana Culture with references provided.
Canva. (2022). "Color meaning and symbolosm: How to use the power of color". 
Canva explains many colors in depth.
Beadage. (1998–2022). Gemstone Meanings & Crystal Properties.
The website defines the meaning of many different crystals and gemstones.
Gemstone Dictionary. "The meaning of Pink Diamond".
The gemstone dictionary explains what different gemstones mean, I used it for the pink diamond.

References 

African culture
African clothing
Jewellery components
Jewellery
Beadwork